

Events

May events 
 May 23 – The Festiniog Railway Company Incorporated by Act of Parliament to build a railway from Festiniog to Portmadoc in North Wales for the carriage of slate and other minerals.

June events
 June 9 – The Strasburg Rail Road, today the oldest short-line railroad in the United States, is incorporated.

July events 
 July 25 – A cable snaps on an incline of the Granite Railway causing the first rail transport related fatality in the United States.

November events
 November 23 – After assembling Delaware, Matthias W. Baldwin builds his first entirely new steam locomotive, named Old Ironsides.
 November 26 – The New York and Harlem Railroad opens in New York City.

December events
 December 5 – First rail carriage of United States mail, to West Chester, Pennsylvania, according to some sources.

Unknown date events
 Matthias W. Baldwin assembles an English-built steam locomotive, the Delaware, for the Newcastle and Frenchtown Railroad; this is the first railroad locomotive that Baldwin works on.
 The Jefferson Works in Paterson, New Jersey, is reorganized as Rogers, Ketchum and Grosvenor (later to become Rogers Locomotive and Machine Works).
 Ross Winans patents the 8-wheel railroad car, but the patent is soon disputed by the Baltimore and Ohio Railroad who call on Gridley Bryant as an expert witness.

Births

January births 
 January 13 – Zerah Colburn, locomotive designer and railroad author (suicide 1870).

May births 
 May 16 – Philip Armour, founder of Armour and Company and subsidiary Armour Refrigerator Line (d. 1901).

December births 
 December 6 – Thaddeus C. Pound, president of Chippewa Falls and Western Railway and St. Paul Eastern Grand Trunk Railway (d. 1914).

Deaths

July births 
 July 25 – Franz Josef Gerstner, Austrian physicist and pioneering railway engineer (b 1756).

November deaths
 November 14 – Charles Carroll of Carrollton, signer of the Declaration of Independence (United States) and co-founder of the Baltimore and Ohio Railroad (b. 1737).

References
 Mitchell, Frank (March 1999), M. W. Baldwin.  Retrieved February 15, 2005.
 Rivanna Chapter, National Railway Historical Society (2005), This Month in Railroad History: July. Retrieved July 22, 2005.